Rapid Deployment Force: Global Conflict (also known as RDF: Global Conflict) is a video game developed and published by Absolute Entertainment for the Sega CD.

Gameplay
Rapid Deployment Force: Global Conflict is an M-1 tank simulator game.

Reception

Next Generation reviewed the game, rating it two stars out of five, and stated that "The graphics are fair, and it moves smoothly, but there's not much here to pop it above average, all the way down to the vague 'terrorists taking over the world' story line." Dan Amrich of Flux magazine described the game as a "Stripped down AH-3 Thunderstrike with a ground view and without a rockin' soundtrack." He praised the game's controls, the HUD and sound effects although criticizing the "poorly acted" and heavily pixelated FMV cutscenes.

Reviews
GamePro (Mar, 1995)
Electronic Gaming Monthly (Apr, 1995)
Video Games & Computer Entertainment - Mar, 1995

References

1995 video games
Absolute Entertainment games
First-person shooters
Sega CD games
Sega CD-only games
Single-player video games
Tank simulation video games
Video games developed in the United States